The proposed State of Jefferson would have been a new state formed by one of two plans for the division of the State of Texas.

Background
The bill that annexed the Republic of Texas to the United States in 1845 allowed up to four new States, in addition to the State of Texas, to be formed out of the territory of the former Republic of Texas. This was due to the fact that Texas was the largest state in the Union at the time and in belief that the population would be shared equally between the planned states. With a few division plans drawn up before the Civil War, Reconstruction brought carpetbaggers that sought the additional government positions that the division of Texas would provide. So the readmittance Constitutional Convention led to five plans being introduced and additional plans of division lines. In the end, the Convention adopted no plan.

1870
With no plan from the Texas Convention, a Congressional plan was drafted to create a State of Lincoln from Texas.  This plan never made it out of the committee.  Instead, the Howard Bill was introduced calling for two territories and future states, Jefferson and Matagorda, to be formed from Texas.  Texas east of the San Antonio River was designated as Jefferson.  The rump Texas would then be admitted under Reconstruction plans.  The new territories would join when they were considered able to function as states.  A competing plan from the state in 1871 proposed a north, east, south, and west division.   Neither legislature made final approval of either plan.

The "division of the state" issue continued over the years with an additional plan in 1906.

1915
With no reapportionment of representatives following the thirteenth U.S. Census, discussion of the division question was renewed in 1914. The western part of Texas had grown in population, and thus should have gotten more representation, but this was dismissed by the legislature. Hardly any state institutions were in the western part of the state. In the Texas Senate, a proposed State of Jefferson was introduced, to be formed from the twenty-fifth, twenty-sixth, twenty-eighth, and twenty-ninth state senate districts. With only six senators supporting the bill, it failed.

Support grew for the State of Jefferson in 1921 with the governor's veto over an agricultural and mechanical college to be located in West Texas. While no bill was proposed, west Texas held a popular meeting over the matter, but support quickly declined.

See also
 Texas divisionism

References 

Proposed states and territories of the United States
History of Texas